Oxymerus is a genus of beetles in the family Cerambycidae, containing the following species:

 Oxymerus aculeatus Dupont, 1838
 Oxymerus basalis (Dalman, 1823)
 Oxymerus bruchi Gounelle, 1913
 Oxymerus chevrolatii Dupont, 1838
 Oxymerus flavescens (Thunberg, 1822)
 Oxymerus lineatus Dupont, 1838
 Oxymerus pallidus Dupont, 1838
 Oxymerus punctatus Gounelle, 1911
 Oxymerus vianai Huedepohl, 1979
 Oxymerus virgatus Gounelle, 1913

References

Trachyderini
Cerambycidae genera